Iveta Štefanová (born 27 November 1983) is a Czech surgeon and politician for the Freedom and Direct Democracy (SPD) party in Chamber of Deputies.

Štefanová was born in Zliv. She first joined the SPD in 2016 and was elected to the Chamber of Deputies of the Czech Republic in 2021 for the South Bohemia constituency list. In politics, she focuses on matters related to health.

References 

1983 births
Living people
People from České Budějovice District
21st-century Czech politicians
Freedom and Direct Democracy MPs
Czech surgeons
Members of the Chamber of Deputies of the Czech Republic (2021–2025)
Charles University alumni